Fistulaphantes is a monotypic genus of Asian dwarf spiders containing the single species, Fistulaphantes canalis. It was first described by A. V. Tanasevitch & Michael I. Saaristo in 2006, and has only been found in Nepal.

See also
 List of Linyphiidae species (A–H)

References

Linyphiidae
Monotypic Araneomorphae genera
Spiders of Asia